Neal Dahlen (born 1940) is a retired American football administrator, who worked for San Francisco 49ers (1979–1996), and the Denver Broncos (1996–2003), and was General Manager of the Broncos from 1999 to January 2002.

Dahlen's seven Super Bowl rings are tied with Tom Brady for the second most in NFL history  (only Bill Belichick has more). He earned five with the 49ers, and two during his time at the Broncos.

Dahlen attended Capuchino High School in San Bruno, California. He then played quarterback at San Jose State University, where he graduated from in 1963 (and earned a master's in 1964).  He then coached baseball and football at Hillsdale High School in San Mateo, as well as at the College of San Mateo.

Dahlen started working part-time for the 49ers in 1979, and earned increasing administrative responsibilities.  He moved to Denver in 1996 to become director of player personnel, and later was named general manager in 1999.  Ted Sundquist replaced him in early 2002, and Dahlen became the team's director of football administration until he retired the following year.

References

Denver Broncos executives
Living people
National Football League general managers
San Jose State Spartans football players
People from San Bruno, California
1940 births